Audiosurf 2, previously named Audiosurf Air, is a rhythm game created by Dylan Fitterer, and the sequel to Audiosurf. It was launched on October 2, 2013, for Windows through Steam Early Access, OS X and Linux versions were released on January 9, 2015. The game is Steam Workshop compatible, allowing players to create and share mods for the game. It came out of early access on May 26, 2015.

Gameplay
The game uses the player's own music library to generate a course the player needs to navigate through. The sequel adds a wakeboarding mode that lets players distort the songs and features two boats that tug players along and provide opportunities to jump and pull off tricks.

Development
A sequel to Audiosurf, Audiosurf Air, was announced via Dylan Fitterer's Twitter account and the Audiosurf launch screen in March 2012. An early access version was released via Steam on October 2, 2013.Audiosurf 2 left Early Access in May 2015.

Reception

IGN awarded the game a score of 7.5 out of 10, saying "Audiosurf 2s excellent Mono mode carries this hypnotic rhythm game through music management issues and lesser modes".

References

2015 video games
Indie video games
Linux games
Multiplayer and single-player video games
Music generated games
Music video games
MacOS games
Puzzle video games
Video games with Steam Workshop support
Video game sequels
Video games with custom soundtrack support
Windows games
Early access video games
Video games developed in the United States
Video games using procedural generation